Hirudinaria is an accepted genus of fungi in the phylum Ascomycota (order and family incertae sedis).  Species are recorded from southern Europe.

Species
The Global Biodiversity Information Facility lists:
 Hirudinaria arundinariae Hara
 Hirudinaria macrospora Ces.
 Hirudinaria mespili Ces.

See also
 List of Ascomycota genera incertae sedis
 Hirudinaria: a genus of leeches

References

External links

Ascomycota genera